Aneta Spornic (born 29 June 1930) was a Romanian politician (Communist). She was born in Bucharest.

From November 1975 to August 1979, she was Deputy Minister of Labour. 

She served as Minister of Education in 1979, having previously taught at the Academy of Economic Studies until 1977. She had also been the chair of the Bucharest Women's Committee.

Spornic was Minister of Education and Instruction from 1979 to 1982. From 1982 to 1984, she held ministerial status on the State Planning Committee, before becoming President of the State Committee on Prices.

References

1930 births
20th-century Romanian women politicians
20th-century Romanian politicians
Possibly living people
Romanian communists
Women government ministers of Romania